Dale C. Allison (born November 25, 1955)  is an American New Testament scholar, historian of Early Christianity, and Christian theologian who for years served as Errett M. Grable Professor of New Testament Exegesis and Early Christianity at Pittsburgh Theological Seminary. He is currently the Richard J. Dearborn Professor of New Testament Studies at Princeton Theological Seminary. He is an ordained elder in the Presbyterian Church (USA).

Career
Allison received a BA from Wichita State University (1977) and an MA (1979) and a PhD (1982) from Duke University.

His works as an author include the books Constructing Jesus: Memory, Imagination, and History, about the gospels, and The Love There That's Sleeping, focusing on the religious songwriting of George Harrison.

References

1955 births
20th-century Christian biblical scholars
21st-century Christian biblical scholars
American biblical scholars
American Christian theologians
Calvinist and Reformed biblical scholars
Critics of the Christ myth theory
Duke University alumni
Friends University people
Living people
New Testament scholars
Pittsburgh Theological Seminary faculty
Place of birth missing (living people)
Princeton Theological Seminary faculty
Texas Christian University faculty
Wichita State University alumni